Shurjeh may refer to:
 Shurjeh-ye Emam Jomeh, East Azerbaijan Province
 Shurjeh-ye Turaghay, East Azerbaijan Province
 Shurjeh, Fars
 Shurjeh, Lenjan, Isfahan Province
 Shurjeh, Markazi
 Shurjeh-ye Olya, Markazi Province
 Shurjeh-ye Sofla, Markazi Province
 Shurjeh, Qazvin
 Shurjeh, West Azerbaijan
 Shurjeh Baruq, West Azerbaijan Province
 Shurjeh Kord, West Azerbaijan Province
 Shurjeh, Zanjan
 Shurjeh Rural District, in Fars Province